The 2013 Men's European Individual Closed Championships is the men's edition of the 2013 European Squash Individual Championships, which serves as the individual European championship for squash players. The event took place in Herentals in Belgium from 4 to 7 September 2013. Grégory Gaultier won his seventh European Individual Championships title, defeating Simon Rösner in the final.

Seeds

Draw and results

Finals

See also
2013 Women's European Individual Closed Championships
European Squash Individual Championships

References

External links
European Squash Championships 2013 official website

2013 in squash
Squash in Europe
Squash tournaments in Belgium
2013 in Belgian sport
International sports competitions hosted by Belgium